Ilona Váradi (4 August 1891 – 19 February 1945) was a Hungarian tennis player. She competed in the women's singles event at the 1924 Summer Olympics.

References

External links
 

1891 births
1945 deaths
Hungarian female tennis players
Olympic tennis players of Hungary
Tennis players at the 1924 Summer Olympics
Tennis players from Budapest
Deaths from sepsis